Čebulj is a Slovene surname. Notable people with the surname include:

Klemen Čebulj (born 1992), Slovenian volleyball player
, Slovenian ice hockey player

Slovene-language surnames